Agostina Alonso (born 1 October 1995) is an Argentine field hockey player and part of the Argentina national team, winning silver medal at the 2020 Summer Olympics.

Career 
She was the part of the Argentine team that won the 2016 Women's Hockey Junior World Cup after a beating the Netherlands in the finals. She also won a gold medal at the 2019 Pan American Games.

References

External links 
 Agostina Alonso at the 2019 Pan American Games

1995 births
Living people
Las Leonas players
Argentine female field hockey players
South American Games gold medalists for Argentina
South American Games medalists in field hockey
Female field hockey midfielders
Field hockey players from Buenos Aires
Competitors at the 2018 South American Games
Field hockey players at the 2019 Pan American Games
Pan American Games gold medalists for Argentina
Pan American Games medalists in field hockey
Medalists at the 2019 Pan American Games
Field hockey players at the 2020 Summer Olympics
Olympic field hockey players of Argentina
Olympic silver medalists for Argentina
Medalists at the 2020 Summer Olympics
Olympic medalists in field hockey
21st-century Argentine women